James Fay may refer to:
James H. Fay (1899–1948), American lawyer and Democratic politician
James Bernard Fay (born 1947), Canadian farmer
James Fay, appeared on Finding Bigfoot
Jimmy Fay (1884–1957), English footballer